Bassersdorf (High Alemannic: Baserschtoorff) is a municipality in the Swiss canton of Zürich, located in the district of Bülach, and belongs to the Glatt Valley (German: Glattal).

History 
The name, mentioned in 1155 as Bazzelstorf and maybe yet in the early 11th century as Basselstorff, is a compound consisting of dorf, a widespread constituent in alemannic placenames meaning ‚hamlet, farm, village, estate‘, and the genitive form of an anthroponym, probably OHG *Bazzilo (or its feminine Bacila, documented in the Abbey of St. Gall). The Alemannic settlement dates to the 8th or 9th century. Due to its position halfway between the towns of Zürich and Winterthur, the village gained some importance as a relay during the 18th and 19th centuries.

Under the Helvetic Republic (1798–1803), it was the district capital.

In 2001, Crossair Flight 3597 crashed into the ground at Bassersdorf while on approach to land at Zurich Airport. Twenty-four of the thirty-three people on board were killed, including American singer Melanie Thornton (the former lead singer of German group La Bouche) and two of the three members of the German group Passion Fruit. The investigation concluded that the accident was a controlled flight into terrain (CFIT) caused by a series of pilot errors and navigation mistakes that led the plane off-course.

Geography
Of this area, 42.5% is used for agricultural purposes, while 30.8% is forested. Of the rest of the land, 26.3% is settled (buildings or roads) and the remainder (0.3%) is non-productive (rivers, glaciers or mountains).

The municipality is located on the edge of the mid-Glatt Valley. Since 1931, the village of Baltenswil has been part of the municipality.

Demographics
, 21.2% of the population was made up of foreign nationals. Over the last 10 years the population has grown at a rate of 50.5%. Most of the population speaks German  (85.8%), with Italian being second most common ( 3.8%) and Serbo-Croatian being third ( 1.7%).

In the 2007 election the most popular party was the SVP which received 37.2% of the vote.  The next three most popular parties were the SPS (19.6%), the FDP (12.4%) and the CSP (10.3%).

The age distribution of the population is children and teenagers (0–19 years old) make up 23.4% of the population, while adults (20–64 years old) make up 65.2% and seniors (over 64 years old) make up 11.4%. In Bassersdorf about 75.5% of the population (between age 25–64) have completed either non-mandatory upper secondary education or additional higher education (either university or a Fachhochschule).
The historical population is given in the following table:

Economy 
Compaq at one point operated its Switzerland offices in Bassersdorf.

Bassersdorf has an unemployment rate of 3.46%.  , there were 53 people employed in the primary economic sector and about 17 businesses involved in this sector.  617 people are employed in the secondary sector and there are 67 businesses in this sector.  2380 people are employed in the tertiary sector, with 267 businesses in this sector.

Transportation 
Bassersdorf railway station is a stop of the S-Bahn Zürich on the lines S24 and S7. Bassersdorf is also served by the bus lines 765, 766, 769, which are operated by the VBG and the bus line 660, which is operated by the Stadtbus Winterthur.

Twin towns – sister cities

Bassersdorf is twinned with:
 Aigle, Switzerland

Gallery

Notable people 

 Elsie Attenhofer (1909 - 1999 in Bassersdorf) a Swiss cabaret artiste, actress, writer and performer of monologues 
 Roy Gelmi (born 1995 in Bassersdorf) a Swiss footballer who plays for VVV-Venlo

Sources

External links 

  

 Statistics 

Municipalities of the canton of Zürich